Streptomyces pentaticus is a bacterium species in the genus Streptomyces.

Uses 
Streptomyces pentaticus is used to produce pentamycin.

References

External links 

pentaticus